Fabiano Batista de Paula (born 28 November 1988 in Rio de Janeiro) is a Brazilian professional tennis player competing mainly on the ATP Challenger Tour both in singles and doubles.

de Paula reached his highest ATP singles ranking, No. 239, on 5 November 2012 and his highest ATP doubles ranking, No. 256 on 5 November 2012.

ATP career finals (2)

Doubles (2)

References

External links

1988 births
Living people
Brazilian male tennis players
Sportspeople from Rio de Janeiro (city)
21st-century Brazilian people